Carmelina Soto Valencia (1916–1994) was a Colombian poet, born in Armenia, Quindío. Some of her well-known works include Bells of Dawn, October and Motionless Time.

Books
 (1941) Campanas del alba
 (1953) Octubre
 (1974) Tiempo inmóvil: Selección Poética.
 (1983) Tiempo inmóvil: Selección Poética. 2ª edición.
 (1983) Un centauro llamado Bolívar.
 (1997) Canción para iniciar un olvido
 (2007) La casa entre la niebla

References

External links
Amediavoz.com
 Sitio oficial de la Alcaldía de Armenia
 Corporación de Cultura y Turismo de Armenia
 Carmelina Soto, Obras, (in Spanish)

1916 births
1994 deaths
20th-century Colombian poets
Colombian women poets
20th-century women writers